NCPC  may refer to:
 National Capital Planning Commission, a U.S. government agency that provides planning guidance for Washington, D.C
 National Counterproliferation Center, the primary organization within the U.S. Intelligence Community for combating the spread of weapons of mass destruction and their delivery systems
 National Crime Prevention Council, an American educational nonprofit organization in Washington, DC
 North China Pharmaceutical Group Corp, a leading pharmaceutical manufacturer in China
 North Coast Parish Church, a church part of Reay Parish Church
 Northern Canada Power Commission, a former Canadian government-owned electric utility

See also
 NCPC-7, an upgraded version of the standard Pilatus PC-7 aircraft with fully IFR glass cockpit avionics, developed for the Swiss Air Force